Salou was a Rodalies de Catalunya railway station serving Salou, in Catalonia, Spain. It was served by Camp de Tarragona commuter rail service line , as well as some trains on regional line .

The station ceased operations on 13 January 2020 due to the opening of a new line bypassing Salou and other stations in the area.

References

External links
 Castelldefels listing at Rodalies de Catalunya website

Railway stations in Spain opened in 1865
Railway stations in Catalonia